Cyanopepla hurama is a moth of the subfamily Arctiinae. It was described by Arthur Gardiner Butler in 1876. It is found in Ecuador, Bolivia and the Amazon region.

References

Cyanopepla
Moths described in 1876